Tommy Møller Nielsen (born 5 August 1961) is a Danish football coach and former player. He is the son of former Danish national football team coach Richard Møller Nielsen. 

He played for Odense Boldklub, Kjøbenhavns Boldklub and Boldklubben 1909. As coach, Nielsen has managed both Boldklubben 1909 and Viborg FF during his career. He joined Rangers on 27 May 1997 as first team coach to replace the departing Davie Dodds. He stayed there for three seasons before becoming Ebbe Skovdahl's number two at Aberdeen for just over a year. 

Nielsen returned to Denmark and to Boldklubben 1909 as coach in 2003 then took up the offer of being Ove Christensen's assistant at Viborg FF. He was a replacement for Flemming Nielsen, who had been promoted to sporting director over Christensen. This was one of the reasons for Christensen's departure in the autumn of 2006. Nielsen became the head coach of Viborg FF until the end of the year and was replaced when by Anders Linderoth in January 2007. Nielsen then returned to his previous position as assistant coach but was sacked along with Linderoth later that year.

On 24 October 2011, he succeeded Aurelijus Skarbalius as manager of HB Køge. He was sacked on 3 September 2012 following a disastrous start to the 2012–13 season.

References
 Report on Rangers switch
 Dons' number two departs
 Tommy Møller Nielsen Interview

1961 births
Living people
Danish men's footballers
Danish football managers
Kjøbenhavns Boldklub players
Odense Boldklub players
Rangers F.C. non-playing staff
Aberdeen F.C. non-playing staff
Viborg FF managers
HB Køge managers
Boldklubben 1909 managers
Manchester United F.C. non-playing staff
Association footballers not categorized by position
Danish 1st Division managers